Kevin McGarrigle (born 9 April 1977) is an English former professional footballer who played as a central defender in the Football League for Brighton & Hove Albion.

Life and career
McGarrigle was born in 1977 in Newcastle upon Tyne, and began his football career with Wallsend Boys Club before signing for Brighton & Hove Albion when he left school in 1993. He made his first-team debut at the end of the 1993–94 season, a few weeks after his 17th birthday, and signed a three-year professional contract. He became a regular towards the end of the following campaign, as one of three central defenders, but appeared increasingly rarely in the final two years of his contract. He went back to his native north-east of England where he played non-league football for clubs including Spennymoor United, Blyth Spartans, Tow Law Town, Crook Town and Chester-le-Street Town.

References

1977 births
Living people
Footballers from Newcastle upon Tyne
English footballers
Association football central defenders
Wallsend Boys Club players
Brighton & Hove Albion F.C. players
Spennymoor United F.C. players
Blyth Spartans A.F.C. players
Tow Law Town F.C. players
Crook Town A.F.C. players
Chester-le-Street Town F.C. players
English Football League players
Northern Premier League players
Northern Football League players